Imone Mohanta (born 1984) is a retired Canadian–American professional soccer player, who last played for Churchill Brothers S.C. in the I-League as a defender. He is currently the head coach of Stanford men's team of the West Coast Soccer Association.

Earlier career
Mohanta, graduated from San Diego State University, began his professional career with newly formed San Diego United of National Premier Soccer League in 2008. He played for a single season until 2009, under coaching of Guy Newman, then manager of the San Diego based side.

India
While playing in tournaments organized by the Indian community in the United States, Mohanta was encouraged to play in the Indian I-League by players from JCT Mills FC. Eventually, he signed for I-League side Churchill Brothers SC, where he almost scored an individual goal on debut against Salgaocar SC.

Managerial career
After retirement, Mohanta began his coaching career in West Coast Soccer Association as a head coach.

Mohanta Sports
Mohanta, a passionate football lover started his footballing management division named Mohanta Sports, which is a group of sports attorneys, work collaboratively with FIFA licensed agents to ensure the highest level of player and coaching representation.

See also
 List of Canadian expatriate soccer players

References

External links
 Canadian players abroad at Soccerway

American soccer players
Canadian soccer players
Living people
1982 births
Association football defenders
Association football midfielders
Churchill Brothers FC Goa players
Expatriate footballers in India
American sportspeople of Indian descent
Canadian sportspeople of Indian descent
Canadian expatriate soccer players
American expatriate soccer players
American expatriate sportspeople in India
I-League players